Mioxena is a genus of dwarf spiders that was first described by Eugène Louis Simon in 1926.

Species
 it contains three species:
Mioxena blanda (Simon, 1884) (type) – Europe
Mioxena celisi Holm, 1968 – Congo, Kenya
Mioxena longispinosa Miller, 1970 – Angola

See also
 List of Linyphiidae species (I–P)

References

Araneomorphae genera
Linyphiidae
Spiders of Africa
Spiders of Russia